The South Africa national cricket team toured England from May to September 1912 and took part in the 1912 Triangular Tournament, playing three Test matches each against the England national cricket team and the Australia national cricket team. The tournament was won by England. South Africa were captained by Frank Mitchell and Louis Tancred.

Test series summary

References

External links
 

1912 in Australian cricket
1912 in English cricket
1912 in South African cricket
1912
International cricket competitions from 1888–89 to 1918